Laulau, otherwise known as Lū in Tonga, Palusami in Melanesia (Fiji) and Samoa, and Rukau in the Cook Islands, is a Polynesian dish consisting of cooked taro leaves containing fillings such as pork, fish or coconut cream. In old Hawaii, laulau was assembled by taking a few leaves and placing a few pieces of fish and pork in the center. In modern times, the dish uses taro leaves, salted butterfish, and either pork, beef, or chicken and is usually steamed on the stove. Laulau is a typical plate lunch dish and is usually served with a side of rice and macaroni salad.

In the classical preparation, the ends of the luau leaf are folded and wrapped again in the leaf. When ready, all the laulau is placed in an underground oven called an imu. Hot rocks are placed on the dish, covered in banana leaves, and buried again. A few hours later, the laulau is ready to eat.

See also
Cabbage roll
Callaloo
 Laing (food)
List of stuffed dishes
Vine leaf roll

References

External links
 

Pork dishes
Fish dishes
Hawaiian cuisine
Polynesian cuisine
Oceanian cuisine
Lunch dishes
National dishes
Taro dishes